The CZW Iron Man Championship was a professional wrestling championship owned by the Combat Zone Wrestling (CZW) promotion. The championship was created and debuted on February 13, 1999, at CZW's Opening Night event. The title is currently inactive, having been deactivated on July 11, 2009. Prior to its retirement, Sami Callihan renamed the title the CZW New Horror Championship, which CZW recognized. Being a professional wrestling championship, the title is won via a scripted ending to a match or awarded to a wrestler because of a storyline.

Overall, there were 37 reigns shared among 24 wrestlers, with two vacancies. All title changes occurred at CZW-promoted events. The inaugural champion was Derek Domino, who was recognized as champion on February 13, 1999, at CZW's Opening Night event by CZW. Wifebeater holds the record of most reigns, with four. At  days, Kevin Steen's only reign is the longest in the title's history. Lobo, with a combined three reigns, holds the record for most days as champion at 392. Domino's only and Wifebeater's second reign share the record for shortest reign at less than one day. Egotistico Fantastico was the final champion in his only reign before the title's deactivation.

History
Upon the title's creation, CZW recognized Derek Domino as the first CZW Iron Man Champion on February 13, 1999 at their Opening Night event. Domino immediately had to defend the title that night against Lobo, who went on to win the match and the championship. On June 10, 2000 at CZW's Caged To The End event, Mad Man Pondo defeated Wifebeater to win the championship. However, on July 22, 2000 at CZW's No Rules, No Limits event, Wifebeater was awarded the championship without facing Pondo in a match for unknown reasons. Instead, that night Wifebeater defended the title against Nick Gage, who went on to win the title. During Lobo's third reign CZW held their Breakaway Brawl show on June 9, 2001. A Triple Threat Deathmatch for the CZW Iron Man Championship occurred involving Nick Mondo, Wifebeater, and Mad Man Pondo, which Mondo won to become champion. Lobo was not involved due to a broken leg injury he sustained from the night before.

At CZW's High Stakes on May 11, 2002, CZW held a Four Way match for the CZW World Heavyweight and CZW Iron Man Championships, in which then-CZW World Heavyweight Champion Justice Pain and then-Iron Man Champion Adam Flash defended against The Messiah and Mondo. If a champion was pinned by another competitor, then they lost their championship in the encounter. Mondo ended up pinning Flash to win the Iron Man Championship in the bout. On July 13, 2002 at CZW's Deja Vu, Flash and Pain fought to a double pinfall for the CZW Iron Man and World Heavyweight Championships, which Pain held. Due to the double pinfall, Flash won the Iron Man Championship, while Pain retained the World Heavyweight Championship.

On August 13, 2005 at CZW's Deja Vu 3, Kevin Steen defeated Franky The Mobster to begin the longest reign in the title's history. At 364 days, Steen's reign came to an end when he was pinned by LuFisto at CZW's Trapped, who became the first woman to win the title. At CZW's X: Decade of Destruction – 10th Anniversary event on February 14, 2009, Sami Callihan defeated Brain Damage to win the title. Later during his reign, Callihan renamed the title the CZW New Horror Championship.

The title was vacated twice during its history before being retired in July 2009. The first vacancy occurred July 26, 2003 due to then-champion Mondo sustaining an injury. LuFisto was forced to vacate on January 13, 2007 when she also sustained an injury. Egotistico Fantastico was the last champion, by defeating Callihan on June 13, 2009 at CZW's Best Of The Best 9 gathering before the title was deactivated on July 11, 2009.

Reigns

Combined reigns

References
General

Specific

External links
CZWrestling.com

Combat Zone Wrestling championships
Hardcore wrestling championships
2009 in professional wrestling
1999 in professional wrestling